Marcello Tegalliano (Latin: Marcellus Tegalianus; died 726) was, according to tradition, the second Doge of Venice (717–726). He is described as having hailed from Eraclea, and during his nine-year reign was apparently in great disagreement with the nearby Longobards. He died in 726 and was succeeded by Orso Ipato.

History

The only certain historical mention of Marcello (the surname Tegalliano is a late-fourteenth-century invention of the chroniclers Nicolò Trevisan and Enrico Dandolo) is the Pactum Lotharii stipulated in 840 between the emperor Lothair I and the doge Pietro Tradonico. 

The text mentions the so-called terminatio liutprandina, an agreement on the delimitation of the borders around Cittanova concluded under the king of the Lombards Liutprand between Duke Paoluccio and the magister militum Marcello and still in force at the time of the Holy Roman Empire.

The Pactum was repeatedly confirmed in the following centuries and was therefore well known to Giovanni Diacono, the first chronicler who, around the year 1000, identified Paoluccio and Marcello respectively as the first and second doges of Venice.

These conclusions were then adopted by subsequent historiography up to the modern era, when some scholars questioned the historicity of Paoluccio and Marcello. For Roberto Cessi the first doge was Orso, directly elected by the Venetians in 726 during a revolt against the government of the Byzantine emperor Leo III the Isaurian; Paoluccio had to be identified with the exarch of Ravenna Paolo, while Marcello had been a magister militum belonging to the Byzantine hierarchy of Venetikà.

Carlo Guido Mor and Stefano Gasparri hypothesized instead that Paoluccio was the Lombard duke of Treviso, while Marcello had been his interlocutor on the Venetian side.

Little is known about Marcello's rule. According to the chronicles, he died after nine years of dogeship - therefore, fixing the death of Paoluccio in 717, and that of Marcello in 726. During Marcello's dogeship the clash between the patriarch of Grado and the patriarch of Aquileia was rekindled. He also repelled an attack from the Umayyads.
In 723, Pope Gregory II sent a letter to the bishops of the ecclesiastical province of Venice and Istria in which he reprimanded Sereno of Aquileia about respecting the rights of Donato of Grado. The text is handed down to us in full by Andrea Dandolo, however, many historians raised doubts about the veracity of the letter. Among the recipients there is also the magister militum Marcello, accompanied by the title of duke. However, the  latter is considered a forgery designed to give greater credence to the document.

According to Andrea Dandolo, Marcello was interred, like his predecessor, in Eraclea. The aforementioned Trevisan and Dandolo, on the basis of the assonance with name and surname, identified Marcello as the progenitor of the Marcello and Fonicalli families.

John Julius Norwich argued that the first doge, Paoluccio Anafesto, was Paul, Exarch of Ravenna, and that Marcello was his magister militum of the same first name.

Notes

Sources
Norwich, John Julius. A History of Venice. Alfred A. Knopf: New York, 1982.
The Penny Cyclopædia of the Society for the Diffusion of Useful Knowledge: Volume 26. Charles Knight: London, 1843.

8th-century Doges of Venice
726 deaths
Year of birth unknown